The Kingdom of Italy (1805–1814;) was a kingdom in Northern Italy (formerly the Italian Republic) in personal union with Napoleon I's French Empire. It was fully influenced by revolutionary France and ended with Napoleon's defeat and fall. Its government was assumed by Napoleon as King of Italy and the viceroyalty delegated to his stepson Eugène de Beauharnais. It covered some of Piedmont and the modern regions of Lombardy, Veneto, Emilia-Romagna, Friuli Venezia Giulia, Trentino, South Tyrol, and Marche. Napoleon I also ruled the rest of northern and central Italy in the form of Nice, Aosta, Piedmont, Liguria, Tuscany, Umbria, and Lazio, but directly as part of the French Empire, rather than as part of a vassal state.

Constitutional statutes

The Kingdom of Italy was born on 17 March 1805, when the Italian Republic, whose president was Napoleon Bonaparte, became the Kingdom of Italy, with the same man (now styled Napoleon I) as the new King of Italy and his 24-year-old stepson Eugène de Beauharnais as his viceroy. Napoleon I was crowned at the Duomo di Milano, Milan on 23 May, with the Iron Crown of Lombardy. His title was "Emperor of the French and King of Italy", showing the importance of this Italian kingdom to him.

Even though the republican constitution was never formally abolished, a series of Constitutional Statutes completely altered it. The first one was proclaimed two days after the birth of the kingdom, on 19 March, when the Consulta declared Napoleon I as king and established that one of his natural or adopted sons would succeed him once the Napoleonic Wars were over, and once separated the two thrones were to remain separate. The second one, dating from 29 March, regulated the regency, the Great Officials of the kingdom, and the oaths.

The most important was the third, proclaimed on 5 June, being the real constitution of the kingdom: Napoleon I was the head of state and had the full powers of government; in his absence, he was represented by the Viceroy, Eugène de Beauharnais. The Consulta, Legislative Council, and Speakers were all merged into a Council of State, whose opinions became only optional and not binding for the king. The Legislative Body, the old parliament, remained in theory, but it was never summoned after 1805; the Napoleonic Code was introduced.

The fourth Statute, decided on 16 February 1806, indicated Beauharnais as the heir to the throne.

The fifth and the sixth Statutes, on 21 March 1808, separated the Consulta from the Council of State, and renamed it the Senate, with the duty of informing the king about the wishes of his most important subjects.

The seventh Statute, on 21 September, created a new nobility of dukes, counts and barons; the eighth and the ninth, on 15 March 1810, established the annuity for the members of the royal family. In 1812, a Court of Accounts was added.

The government had seven ministers:
 The Minister of War was at first General Augusto Caffarelli, later General Giuseppe Danna for a year, and then, from 1811, General Achille Fontanelli;
 The Minister of Interior was at first Ludovico Arborio di Breme and then, from 1809, Luigi Vaccari;
 The Minister for Foreign Affairs was Ferdinando Marescalchi;
 The Minister of Justice and Great Judge was Giuseppe Luosi;
 The Minister of the Treasury was Antonio Veneri and then, from 1811, Ambrogio Birago;
 The Minister of Finance was Giuseppe Prina;
 The Minister of Religion was Giovanni Bovara.

Image gallery

Territory

Originally, the Kingdom consisted of the territories of the Italian Republic: former Duchy of Milan, Duchy of Mantua, Duchy of Modena, the western part of the Republic of Venice, part of the Papal States in Romagna, and the Department of Agogna (it) centred on Novara.

After the defeat of the Third Coalition and the consequent Treaty of Pressburg, on 1 May 1806, the Kingdom gained from Austria the eastern and remaining part of the Venetian territories, including Istria and Dalmatia down to Kotor (then called Cattaro), though it lost Massa and Carrara to Elisa Bonaparte's Principality of Lucca and Piombino. The Duchy of Guastalla was annexed on 24 May.

With the Convention of Fontainebleau with Austria of 10 October 1807, Italy ceded Monfalcone to Austria and gained Gradisca, putting the new border on the Isonzo River.

The conquered Republic of Ragusa was annexed in spring 1808 by General Auguste de Marmont. On 2 April 1808, following the dissolution of the Papal States, the Kingdom annexed the present-day Marches. At its maximum extent, the Kingdom had 6,700,000 inhabitants and was composed by 2,155 communes.

The final arrangement arrived after the new defeat of Austria: Emperor Napoleon and King Maximilian I Joseph of Bavaria signed the Treaty of Paris on 28 February 1810, deciding an exchange of territories involving Italy too.

On rewards in Germany, Bavaria ceded southern Tirol to the Kingdom of Italy, which in its turn ceded Istria and Dalmatia (with Ragusa) to France, incorporating the Adriatic territories into newly created the French Illyrian Provinces. Small changes to the borders between Italy and France in Garfagnana and Friuli came in act on 5 August 1811.

In practice, the Kingdom was a dependency of the French Empire.

The Kingdom served as a theater in Napoleon's operations against Austria during the wars of the various coalitions. Trading with the United Kingdom was forbidden.

Currency

The kingdom was given a new national currency, replacing the local coins circulating in the country: the Italian lira, of the same size, weight, and metal of the French franc. Mintage being decided by Napoleon with an imperial decree on 21 March 1806, the production of the new coins began in 1807. The monetary unit was the silver lira, which was 5 grams heavy. There were multiples of £2 (10 grams of silver) and £5 (25 grams of silver), and precious coins of £20 (6.45 grams of gold) and £40 (12.9 grams of gold). The lira was basically divided in 100 cents, and there were coins of 1 cent (2.1 grams of copper), 3 cents (6.3 grams of copper), and 10 cents (2 grams of poor silver), but following the tradition, there was a division in 20 soldi, with coins of 1 soldo (10.5 grams of copper, in practice 5 cents), 5 soldi (1.25 grams of silver), 10 soldi (2.5 grams of silver), and 15 soldi (3.75 grams of silver).

Army
The army of the kingdom, inserted into the Grande Armée, took part in all of Napoleon's campaigns.
In the course of its existence from 1805 to 1814 the Kingdom of Italy provided Napoleon I with roughly around 200,000 soldiers.

In 1805 Italian troops served on garrison duty along the English Channel, during 1806–07 they took part in the sieges of Kolberg and Danzig and fought in Dalmatia. From 1808 to 1813 whole Italian divisions served in Spain, especially distinguishing themselves under Suchet at Tarragona and Saguntum.

In 1809, Eugène's Army of Italy formed the right wing of Napoleon I's invasion of the Austrian Empire, winning a considerable victory at Raab and having a respectable share in the victory at Wagram.

In 1812, Eugène de Beauharnais marched 27,000 troops of the Kingdom of Italy into Russia. The Italian contingent distinguished themselves at Borodino and Maloyaroslavets, receiving the recognition: 
Only 1,000–2,000 Italians survived the Russian campaign, but they returned with most of their banners secured. In 1813, Eugène de Beauharnais held out as long as possible against the onslaught of the Austrians (Battle of the Mincio) and was later forced to sign an armistice in February 1814.

Infantry:
 Line infantry: five regiments from the Italian Republic, with two more later raised, in 1805 and 1808.
 Light infantry: three regiments from the Italian Republic, plus another one raised in 1811.
 Royal Guard: two battalions from the Italian Republic (Granatieri and Cacciatori), plus other two (Velites) raised in 1806, plus two battalions of young guard raised in 1810, and another two raised in 1811.

Cavalry:
 Dragoons: two regiments from the Italian Republic.
 Cacciatori a Cavallo (light horse): one regiment from the Italian Republic, plus three others, raised in 1808, 1810, and 1811.
 Royal Guard: two squadrons of dragoons, five companies of Guards of Honour.

Local administration

The administrative system of the Kingdom was firstly drawn by a law on 8 June 1805. The state was divided, following the French system, in 14 départements, the twelve ones inherited from the republican era plus Adda (Sondrio) and Adige (Verona). The chief of the department, the prefect, was the State's representative in each province, improved the administrative decisions of the central government, controlled the local authorities, led of the police and, differently from the republican era, had all the executive powers in its territory. The local legislative body was the General Council, composed by the representatives of the communes.

The departments were divided in districts, equivalent to the French arrondissements. The chief of the district was the vice-prefect, which had similar powers to the prefect, but over a smaller area. The local legislative body was the District Council, composed by eleven members. The districts were divided, as in France, in cantons, seats of Tax collectors and Justices of the peace.

The cantons were divided in communes. The communes had a City Council (Consiglio Comunale) of fifteen, thirty or forty members, chosen by the king or the prefect depending by the commune size. The Council elected two, four or six Elders for the ordinary administration, helped by a City Secretary. The chief of biggest communes was the royal Podestà, when in smaller communes there was a prefectoral Mayor. All the city offices were held only by owners and traders, and the leadership of the owners was assured.

During the kingdom's life, the administrative system of the State changed for domestic and international reasons. Following the defeat of Austria and the Treaty of Pressburg, Napoleon annexed to Italy the territory of former Republic of Venice, as announced on 30 March 1806, and ratified on 1 May. Seven new departments were created, six in the Venetian mainland, and one in Istria (Capodistria), whereas Dalmatia received special institutions led by the General Provider Mr. Dandolo, and maintained its own laws. On 14 July 1807, the government passed a decree that reduced the number of the communes. Following the dissolution of the Papal States, the kingdom was extended along the Adriatic coast, and on 20 April 1808, three new departments were established. The final territorial change came in action on 10 June 1810, when, as announced by Napoleon on previous 28 May, Italy lost Istria and the never fully incorporated Dalmatia, gaining as reward all the southern Tirol up to the city of Bolzano, creating the 24th and last department: Haut Adige.

Language and education
The language used officially in the Kingdom of Italy was Italian. The French language was used for ceremonies and in all relationships with France.

Education was made universal for all children, which was also conducted in Italian. By decree of the governor Vincenzo Dandolo, this was so even in Istria and Dalmatia, where local populations were more heterogeneous.

List of departments and districts

During its last maximum extension (from 1809 to 1814), the Kingdom lost Istria/Dalmatia but got added Bolzano/Alto Adige and consisted of 24 departments.

  (capital Sondrio)
 No districts
  (capital Verona)
  (capital Novara)
 District of Novara, District of Vigevano, District of Domodossola, District of Varallo, District of Arona
 Alto Adige (capital Trento)
  (capital Reggio Emilia)
  (capital Como)
 District of Como, District of Varese, District of Menaggio, District of Lecco
  (capital Ferrara)
  (capital Brescia)
 District of Brescia, District of Chiari, District of Verolanuova, District of Salò
  (capital Mantua)
 District of Mantua, District of Revere, District of Castiglione
  (capital Milan)
 District of Milan, District of Pavia, District of Monza, District of Gallarate
  (capital Modena)
  (capital Bologna)
  (capital Cesena)
  (capital Bergamo)
 District of Bergamo, District of Treviglio, District of Clusone, District of Breno
  (capital Cremona)
 District of Cremona, District of Crema, District of Lodi, District of Casalmaggiore
  (capital Venice)
  (capital Vicenza)
  (capital Padua)
 
  (capital Udine)
  (capital Belluno)
  (capital Treviso)
  (capital Ancona)
  (capital Macerata)
  (capital Fermo)

Decline and fall

When Napoleon abdicated both the thrones of France and Italy on 11 April 1814, Eugène de Beauharnais was lined up on the Mincio River with his army to repel any invasion from Germany or Austria, and he attempted to be crowned king. The Senate of the Kingdom was summoned on 17 April, but the senators showed themselves undecided in that chaotic situation. When a second session of the assembly took place on 20 April, the Milan insurrection foiled the Viceroy's plan. In the riots, finance minister Count Giuseppe Prina was massacred by the crowd, and the Great Electors disbanded the Senate and called the Austrian forces to protect the city, while a Provisional Regency Government under the presidency of Carlo Verri was appointed.

Eugène surrendered on 23 April, and was exiled to Bavaria by the Austrians, who occupied Milan on 28 April. On 26 April, the Empire appointed Annibale Sommariva as Imperial Commissioner of Lombardy, while many taxes were abolished or reduced by the Provisional Regency. Finally, on 25 May, the Supreme Imperial Commissioner Count Heinrich von Bellegarde took all the powers in Lombardy, and former monarchies in Modena, Romagna and Piedmont were gradually re-established; on 30 May, the Treaty of Paris was signed, and the remains of the kingdom were annexed by the Austrian Empire, as announced by Count Bellegarde on 12 June.

See also

Coat of arms of Napoleonic Italy
Emblem of Italy
Flags of Napoleonic Italy

References

Further reading
 Connelly, Owen.  Napoleon's Satellite Kingdoms (1965)
 Gregory, Desmond.  Napoleon's Italy (2001)
 Rath, R. John. The Fall of the Napoleonic Kingdom of Italy (1814) (1941)

External links
 Napitalia. The Eagle in Italy about the army of the Kingdom of Italy under Napoleon.

 
Kingdom of Italy
Kingdom of Italy
Former kingdoms
Kingdom of Italy
Former monarchies of Europe
Kingdom of Italy (Napoleonic)
Kingdom of Italy
Kingdom of Italy
Kingdom of Italy
Kingdom of Italy
1805 establishments in Europe
1814 disestablishments in Europe
Kingdom of Italy
Kingdom of Italy
Former countries